Justinianopolis was a Roman and Byzantine era city and ancient Bishopric in Galatia.  It has been identified  with modern Sivrihisar, Eskişehir Province Central Anatolia, Turkey. It was one of several Ancient sites renamed in late Antiquity after Byzantine emperor Justinian I.

History
It was built as one of a chain of defensive points in the Byzantine empire. and in 883 was recorded for the first time as the metropolis of the Province.  The archbishop of Pessinus moved his see to the new capital at this time.

It is mentioned by Hierocles.

Bishopric
The city was also the seat of an ancient Bishopric; little is known of the see, as it was not represented in the Church Councils.

References

Sources
 
 

Greek colonies in Anatolia
Ancient Greek archaeological sites in Turkey
Roman towns and cities in Turkey
Populated places of the Byzantine Empire
Former populated places in Turkey
Populated places in ancient Galatia
Sivrihisar District